Motlatsi Maseela (born 4 October 1971) is a Mosotho former footballer who played as a defender. Between 1995 and 2004, he won 84 caps and scored one goal for the Lesotho national football team.

External links
 

Association football defenders
Lesotho footballers
Lesotho international footballers
1971 births
Living people